Semniomima flaviceps is a moth in the family Crambidae. It was described by Hermann Burmeister in 1878. It is found in Argentina.

References

Moths described in 1878
Pyraustinae